The following is a list of Kurdish philosophers.

9th century 
 Ziryab

11th century 
 Ali Hariri
 Al-Mawardi
 Al-Jazari
 Sheikh Adi ibn Musafir

12th century 
 Ali Hariri
 Al-Mawardi
 Fexredîn

13th century 
 Ibn al-Salah
 Ibn al-Mustawfi
 Ibn Khallikan
 Abu'l-Fida
 Al-Shahrazuri

14th century 
 Ibn al-Jazari
 Zain al-Din al-'Iraqi

15th century 
 Mela Hesenê Bateyî
 Mala Pareshan

16th century 
 Malaye Jaziri
 Sharaf Khan Bidlisi
 Ali Taramakhi

17th century 
 Ahmad Khani
 Faqi Tayran
 Mustafa Besarani

18th century 
 Khâlid-i Baghdâdî
 Khana Qubadi

19th century 
 Mahmud Bayazidi
 Mawlawi Tawagozi
 Nalî
 Mastoureh Ardalan
 Abdullah Cevdet
 Riza Talabani
 Mulla Effendi
 Wafayi
 Mahwi

20th century 
 Said Nursî
 Baba Mardoukh Rohanee
 Qanate Kurdo
 Muhammad Amin Zaki
 Abdul Karim Mudarris
 Muhammad Kurd Ali
 Abdurrahman Sharafkandi
 Celadet Bedir Khan

References 
Muhammad Amin Zaki, Meşahirê Kurd û Kurdistan (Kürt ve Kürdistan Ünlüleri), Öz-Ge Yayınları, 2005 , 9789757861126

 
Kurdish